Michael Louis Schneck (born August 4, 1977) is a former American football long snapper who played in the National Football League (NFL) for eleven seasons.  He played college football for the University of Wisconsin.  He was signed by the Pittsburgh Steelers as an undrafted free agent in 1999, and also played for the Buffalo Bills and Atlanta Falcons.

Early years
Schneck attended Whitefish Bay High School, where in addition to handling longsnapping duties, he was a two-time All-League linebacker and the team captain and the Team MVP as a senior.

Professional career

Pittsburgh Steelers
Beginning in 1999, Schneck spent the first six years of his career as the Steelers' long snapper.

Buffalo Bills
He was signed as a free agent by the Bills in 2005. Schneck was selected to his first Pro Bowl in 2005, alongside teammate Brian Moorman. He was released by the Bills during final cuts on September 1, 2007.

Atlanta Falcons

On October 2, 2007, he signed with the Falcons.  Schneck announced his retirement from the NFL on March 4, 2010.

Personal
Married to Amanda, and the two have a first born, Joseph, second, Kylie, and third, Sam. They also have two dogs named Mocha and Twinkie.

External links

1977 births
Living people
American football long snappers
Pittsburgh Steelers players
Buffalo Bills players
Atlanta Falcons players
Wisconsin Badgers football players
People from Whitefish Bay, Wisconsin
Players of American football from Wisconsin
American Conference Pro Bowl players
Whitefish Bay High School alumni